This is a list of disasters involving ferries of South Korea.

See also
 List of maritime disasters
 List of RORO vessel accidents

References

Disasters

South Korean ferry disasters
South Korean ferry disasters